Carlo Antonio Dal Pozzo (1547–1607) was an Italian prelate, who was archbishop metropolitan of the Pisa Diocese.
He came from the noble family of Dal Pozzo Della Cisterna of Biella. He was the uncle of Cassiano dal Pozzo.

Between his many works, he ordered to build the homonym chapel in the Camposanto Monumentale in Pisa (1594), he made the Collegio Puteano to host some students from Piedmont (1605) and he made cast the homonym bell in the leaning tower (1606).

A portrait bust of Dal Pozzo was made in 1622-4 by the noted Italian artist Gianlorenzo Bernini. It is now in the National Galleries of Scotland, Edinburgh.

External links
Official site of Pisa Archdiocese
Public Record Offices of Biella: Records of the Dal Pozzo della Cisterna family

Roman Catholic archbishops of Pisa
1547 births
1607 deaths
17th-century Italian Roman Catholic archbishops
16th-century Italian nobility
Carlo Antonio